Nicholas Johnson (born September 23, 1934) is an American academic and lawyer. He wrote How to Talk Back to Your Television Set and was a Federal Communications Commission commissioner from 1966 to 1973. He is retired from teaching at the University of Iowa College of Law, with an emphasis on communications and Internet law, and since 2006 has posted over 1000 blog essays.

Life
Johnson was born in Iowa City in 1934 and raised in Iowa, to which he returned in 1980. His father was the noted psychologist and speech scientist, Wendell Johnson, lead researcher of the controversial Monster Study. He received his undergraduate and law degrees from the University of Texas at Austin, served as law clerk to U.S. Court of Appeals, 5th Circuit, Judge John R. Brown and U.S. Supreme Court Justice Hugo L. Black. He began his law teaching career at the University of California, Berkeley, practiced with Covington & Burling, Washington, and held three presidential appointments, including Administrator, U.S. Maritime Administration, and F.C.C. commissioner. Following the F.C.C. service he chaired the National Citizens Committee for Broadcasting in Washington, and ran for Congress from Iowa's Third Congressional District.

In 1972 Canadian filmmaker Red Burns, who'd served on the National Film Board of Canada (NFB)'s Challenge for Change and George C. Stoney, who'd likewise served a guest role, worked with Johnson to make the FCC Public-access television cable TV requirements.  In the book "How to Talk Back to Your Television Set," Johnson discusses prototype community media.  He appeared on the cover of Rolling Stone #79, April 1, 1971.

He hosted the PBS program, "New Tech Times," wrote a nationally syndicated newspaper column, "Communications Watch," and lectured through the Leigh Lecture Bureau during the early 1980s.  He became involved in online education in the mid-1980s, when he chaired the Virtual Classroom Project, taught for the Western Behavioral Sciences Institute and Connected Education. He has served as co-director of the University of Iowa's public health organization, the Institute for Health, Behavior and Environmental Policy, as commissioner with the Iowa City Broadband and Telecommunications Commission, and school board member of the Iowa City Community School District.

He has traveled and lectured in many countries, and served on numerous boards and advisory boards, such as Common Cause (national board), World Academy of Art and Science (executive board), Volunteers in Technical Assistance (board), and Project Censored (editorial judge).

In 2009 he was included in The Yale Biographical Dictionary of American Law as one of 700 individuals described by the publisher as "leading figures in the history of American law, from the colonial era to the present day."

Works
In addition to How to Talk Back to Your Television Set (Little-Brown; Bantam, 1970) and Test Pattern for Living (Bantam, 1972), he is the author of Your Second Priority: A Former FCC Commissioner Speaks Out (2008), Are We There Yet: Reflections on Politics in America (2008), What Do You Mean and How Do You Know? An Antidote for the Language That Does Our Thinking for Us (2009), Virtualosity: Eight Students in Search of Cyberlaw (2009), "Predicting Our Future Cyberlife" (2012), "From D.C. to Iowa: 2012 (2012), and new editions of "How to Talk Back to Your Television Set" (2013) and "Test Pattern for Living" (2013).

See also
Public access television
International Leadership Forum
List of law clerks of the Supreme Court of the United States (Seat 1)

Sources
For general sources and verification see, e.g.: Who's Who in America (past and current editions); Roger K. Newman, ed., The Yale Biographical Dictionary of American Law (New Haven & London: Yale University Press, 2009); University of Iowa College of Law Faculty listing; "Articles About Nicholas Johnson" (including Rolling Stone cover story, Howard Junker, "The Greening of Nicholas Johnson," Rolling Stone, April 1, 1971, pp. 32–39); and New York Times archives (search on "Nicholas Johnson," especially, e.g., "From: 01-01-1963 To: 12-31-1980"). See also "Nicholas Johnson Bibliography (1952–1996)"; "Nicholas Johnson Recent Publications (1996–2013)"; "Nicholas Johnson Federal Communications Commission Opinions".

References

External links

Official blog at Blogspot
Nicholas Johnson on the International Leadership Forum

1934 births
Living people
University of Texas School of Law alumni
Law clerks of the Supreme Court of the United States
UC Berkeley School of Law faculty
American legal scholars
University of Iowa College of Law faculty
Members of the Federal Communications Commission
People associated with Covington & Burling
Lyndon B. Johnson administration personnel
Nixon administration personnel